Desmatoneura is a genus of bee flies in the family Bombyliidae. There are about 18 described species in Desmatoneura.

Species
These 18 species belong to the genus Desmatoneura:

 Desmatoneura aegypticola (Paramonov, 1935) c g
 Desmatoneura albifacies (Macquart, 1840) c g
 Desmatoneura argentifrons Williston, 1895 i c g b
 Desmatoneura brevipennis (Bezzi, 1924) c g
 Desmatoneura choreutes (Bowden, 1964) c g
 Desmatoneura davidi Zaitzev, 1997 c g
 Desmatoneura erythrostoma (Rondani, 1873) c g
 Desmatoneura flavifrons (Becker, 1915) c g
 Desmatoneura frontalis (Wiedemann, 1828) c g
 Desmatoneura kinereti Zaitzev, 1999 c g
 Desmatoneura meridionalis (Hesse, 1956) c g
 Desmatoneura nivea (Rossi, 1790) c g
 Desmatoneura niveisquamis (Brunetti, 1909) c g
 Desmatoneura sarawaka Evenhuis, 1982 c g
 Desmatoneura sardoa (Macquart, 1849) c g
 Desmatoneura sica Greathead, 1969 c g
 Desmatoneura stackelbergi Zaitzev, 1999 c g
 Desmatoneura turkmenica Zaitzev, 2002 c g

Data sources: i = ITIS, c = Catalogue of Life, g = GBIF, b = Bugguide.net

References

Further reading

 

Bombyliidae
Articles created by Qbugbot
Bombyliidae genera